Thieves' Guild 8 is a supplement published by Gamelords in 1983 for the fantasy role-playing game Thieves' Guild. It is the eighth of ten books in the series.

Contents
In the Thieves' Guild fantasy role-playing game, players take on the roles of thieves in an underworld of crime. In a series of supplements, Gamelords presented a number of adventures as well as extra rules.  Thieves' Guild 8 contains expanded rules for ranged weapons, and further explanation and adventure hooks for 
 highwaymen 
 cat burglars
 various types of armed robberies
temple looters and tomb robbers
 pickpockets and cutpurses
 assassins
 pirates 

Two adventures are included: 
the adventurers must rescue a kidnapped bride
In Part 1 of "Secret of the Crystal Mountains", the players enter the haunted Eregin Forest, seeking a treasure of glowing crystals. (Continued in Thieves' Guild 9: Escape From the Ashwood Mines).

Publication history
Gamelords first published Thieves' Guild in 1980. Over the next four years, they released nine more supplements, including Thieves' Guild 8 in 1983, a 32-page softcover book written by Kerry Lloyd, Alfred Hipkins, and Janet Trautvetter, with artwork by Becky Harding, Denis Loubet, Wallace Miller, Larry Shade, Hannah M. G. Shapero, John Statema, and Janet Trautvetter.

Reception
Chris Hunter reviewed both Thieves' Guild 8 and Thieves' Guild 9: Escape From the Ashwood Mines for Imagine magazine, and stated that "The scenarios are all very good though some need a little extra work to flesh them out."

Reviews
Different Worlds #45 (March/April, 1987)

References

Role-playing game supplements introduced in 1983
Thieves' Guild (role-playing game) supplements